Dahira jitkae is a moth of the family Sphingidae. It is known from Sichuan in China, where it occurs at around 1,300 meters altitude.

The wingspan is about 50 mm. It is very similar to Dahira niphaphylla, but with markedly different male genitalia.

References

Dahira
Moths described in 2007